The 1884 Dartmouth football team represented Dartmouth College in the 1884 college football season. Dartmouth compiled a record of 1–2–1.

Schedule

References

Dartmouth
Dartmouth Big Green football seasons
Dartmouth football